The Australia-Solomon Islands Bilateral Security Treaty (full title: Agreement between the Government of Australia and the Government of Solomon Islands Concerning the Basis for Deployment of Police, Armed Forces, and other Personnel to Solomon Islands) is a treaty between Australia and the Solomon Islands. The treaty was signed in 2017 and came into force in 2018. The treaty replaces the Regional Assistance Mission to Solomon Islands (RAMSI) treaty which expired in 2017 when Australian personnel were withdrawn.

The treaty allows for Australian police, defence and civilian personnel to deploy to the Solomon Islands to assist with a range of security threats, including natural disasters, where both governments agree.

The treaty was invoked in November 2021 when the Solomon Islands government requested assistance from Australia to support the Royal Solomon Islands Police Force in restoring order during the 2021 Solomon Islands unrest.

References

External links
Agreement between the Government of Australia and the Government of Solomon Islands Concerning the Basis for Deployment of Police, Armed Forces, and other Personnel to Solomon Islands - Australasian Legal Information Institute

Treaties of the Solomon Islands
Treaties of Australia
Treaties concluded in 2018
Australia–Solomon Islands relations
2018 in Australia
2018 in the Solomon Islands